Changuinola I Dam, is located in district of Changuinola, in the Province of Bocas del Toro, in the western part of Panama. It is the largest roller-compacted concrete arch-gravity dam in the World.

Technical features
The design of the dam was conducted by Malcolm Dunstan & Associates engineering and construction company.

The construction of the dam started on October 25, 2007 and its first generator was operational on November 19, 2011. The induced joints are spaced at  intervals, with inducers installed in every second layer after compaction. The downstream face slope varies form 0.5:1 (H:V) in the center and 0.7:1 (H:V) on the flanks.

The composition of the high-paste RCC mix included:
 Portland Cement - 70 kg/m3
 Fly Ash - 145 kg/m3 
 Water - 119 kg/m3
 Coarse Aggregate - 1282 kg/m3
 Fine Aggregate - 888 kg/m3
 Retarder - 3.44 kg/m3

See also

 List of power stations in Panama

References 

Dams completed in 2011
Energy infrastructure completed in 2011
Dams in Panama
Hydroelectric power stations in Panama
Arch-gravity dams
Buildings and structures in Bocas del Toro Province
Roller-compacted concrete dams